The Grand Bazaar in Istanbul has four main gates situated at the ends of its two major streets which intersect near the southwestern corner of the bazaar. One street connects the Bayezid II Mosque and Beyazıt Square with the Nuruosmaniye Mosque. As everywhere in the East, traders of the same type of good were forcibly concentrated along one road, which got its name from their profession. The names of the streets in the Grand Bazaar give us precious information about the goods and the profession in use during the Ottoman Empire.

Streets, hans and gates

References

Bazaars in Turkey
Fatih
Shopping malls in Istanbul
Grand Bazaar